Baroque pearls are pearls with an irregular, non-spherical shape. Shapes can range from minor aberrations to distinctly ovoid, curved, pinched, or lumpy shapes. Most cultured freshwater pearls are baroque because freshwater pearls are mantle-tissue nucleated instead of bead nucleated. Cultured saltwater pearls can also be baroque, but tend to be more teardrop-shaped due to the use of a spherical, nucleation bead.

The most valuable baroque pearls are the South Sea and the Tahitian pearls, which are produced by Pinctada margaritifera (black-lipped oysters) and Pinctada maxima (gold-lipped and white-lipped oysters).  Although these are a variety of cultured saltwater pearls, the amount of time that the pearls are cultured dramatically increases the depth of the nacre, and the likelihood of producing a baroque pearl. Most Tahitian pearl farm harvests, which, for example, produce more than 40 percent baroque and semi-baroque pearls. Western Australia is currently the world's largest cultivator of pearls from Pinctada maxima gold-lipped oysters, whereas Tahiti is the number one cultivator of pearls from Pinctada margaritifera black-lipped oysters.

References 

Pearls